Kybong is a rural locality in the Gympie Region, Queensland, Australia.

Geography 
The Mary River forms the western boundary.

The locality is home to a large truck stop on the Old Bruce Highway and Gympie Airport. The truck stop is home to Matilda, the mascot of the 1982 Commonwealth Games.

History
In the  Kybong had a population of 370 people.

Heritage listings 
Kybong has the following heritage sites:

 Bruce Highway: Kybong Hall

References

Gympie Region
Localities in Queensland